Anne Pramaggiore was senior executive vice president and CEO of Exelon Utilities, which oversees energy company Exelon Corporation's six local gas and electric utility companies. Those companies are Atlantic City Electric, BGE, Delmarva Power, PECO Energy, Pepco, and ComEd, where Pramaggiore served as the first female president and CEO before becoming Exelon Utilities’ leader. In October 2019, she announced her retirement amid a federal probe into the ComEd's efforts to lobby members of the Illinois state senate.

Pramaggiore previously served as chair of the board of the Federal Reserve Bank of Chicago, a position she resigned in October 2019. She is an independent director of Babcock and Wilcox and Motorola Solutions, Inc. In 2017 she was named to the board of directors of the National Safety Council. She also serves on several civic and community organization boards. Chicago Magazine listed her as one of the '100 most powerful Chicagoans' in 2013, and she was number five on Crain's Chicago Business "20 most powerful women" list in 2014.

Early life and education 

Anne Pramaggiore was born on August 9, 1958, to Alfred Pramaggiore and Jeanne Lacy Pramaggiore. Alfred Pramaggiore was born in Brooklyn, New York, to parents who emigrated from Italy. After graduating from City College of New York, Alfred pursued a career as a civil engineer. Jeanne Lacy Pramaggiore was a girl scout leader who later worked on political campaigns. She also served as a president of the Ohio Genealogical Society.

Pramaggiore graduated from Miami University in Oxford, Ohio in 1980 with a bachelor's degree in theater. She later attended DePaul University College of Law and served as the editor-in-chief of the school's Law Review. She earned her law degree in 1989.

Career 

While still living in Ohio, Pramaggiore completed the management training program at Elder Beerman Department Store. She went on to become an assistant department manager at the store and then became a buyer for Snyder's Department Store in Louisville, Kentucky.

After attending law school, Pramaggiore took a position as a clerk in the U.S. District Court for the Northern District of Illinois under Judge Charles P. Kocoras. She considered Judge Kocoras a 'significant mentor.' She clerked from 1989 to 1990. She next became an associate and eventually a partner at the law firm of McDermott Will & Emery, remaining there until 1998.

Commonwealth Edison 

Pramaggiore joined Commonwealth Edison as an attorney focused on deregulation and was named senior vice president at the utility in 2006. She was promoted to president and CEO of the utility in February 2012. She was the first female to hold the post of president and CEO at the electric utility. Known as ComEd, the company delivers electricity to more than four million customers in Chicago and Northern Illinois.

At ComEd, Pramaggiore set the legislative framework for the company's smart grid build out which has become a national model. Under her leadership, ComEd "worked closely with the community solar industry" to implement a 2016 law called the Future Energy Jobs Act which created incentives for using more energy from solar and other renewable sources.

Exelon Utilities 

In May 2018, Pramaggiore was named senior executive vice president and CEO of Exelon Utilities, where she oversees ComEd and five other gas and electric utility companies.

On Wednesday, November 18, 2020 Pramaggiore was indicted by the U.S Attorney for the Northern District of Illinois for bribery conspiracy, bribery and willfully falsifying ComEd books and records.

Recognition and honors 

As a community and industry leader, Pramaggiore has received multiple awards, commendations and appointments. In 2017, she was named the energy industry's Thought Leader of the Year. She was also selected by the Keystone Policy Center as one of five leaders honored for "achievements and commitments to finding collaborative solutions." In 2016 and 2017, she co-chaired the Aspen institute's annual Energy Policy Forum. She was named one of Chicago's 25 most powerful women in 2016 and one of Chicago Magazine's 100 most powerful Chicagoans in 2013. She was ranked 5th on Crain's Chicago Business most powerful women list in 2014, the same year she was designated utility industry CEO of the year by Energy Central Magazine. She has also received the Civic Engagement Award from her undergraduate alma mater, Miami University of Ohio.

She serves on the boards of Northwestern Memorial Hospital, Motorola Solutions, Babcock and Wilcox Enterprises, DePaul University and the Federal Reserve Bank of Chicago, where she is chair of the board.

Racketeering Charges 

On March 2, 2022, Pramaggiore was indicted on charges of bribery conspiracy. Indicted in the same case on federal racketeering charges was Michael Madigan, former long-time speaker of the Illinois House of Representatives.

References

External links 

 Anne Pramaggiore Bio at Exelon

1958 births
Living people
American women chief executives
DePaul University College of Law alumni
Miami University alumni
People from Brooklyn
21st-century American women